Interstate 45 (I-45) is a major Interstate Highway located entirely within the US state of Texas. While most Interstate routes which have numbers ending in "5" are cross-country north–south routes, I-45 is comparatively short, with the entire route located in Texas. Additionally, it has the shortest length of all the interstates that end in a "5." It connects the cities of Dallas and Houston, continuing southeast from Houston to Galveston over the Galveston Causeway to the Gulf of Mexico.

I-45 replaced U.S. Highway 75 (US 75) over its entire length, although portions of US 75 remained parallel to I-45 until its elimination south of Downtown Dallas in 1987. At the south end of I-45, State Highway 87 (SH 87, formerly part of US 75) continues into downtown Galveston. The north end is at I-30 in Downtown Dallas, where US 75 used the Good-Latimer Expressway. A short continuation, known by traffic reporters as the I-45 overhead, signed as part of US 75, and officially I-345, continues north to the merge with the current end of US 75. Traffic can use State Highway Spur 366 (Spur 366, better known locally as the Woodall Rodgers Freeway) to connect to I-35E at the north end of I-345.

The portion of I-45 between downtown Houston and Galveston is known to Houston residents as the Gulf Freeway. The short elevated section of I-45, which forms the southern boundary of downtown Houston, is known as the Pierce Elevated after the surface street next to which the freeway runs, while north of I-10 it is known as the North Freeway. I-45 and I-345 in the Dallas area, north of the interchanges with I-20 and SH 310 (old US 75), is the Julius Schepps Freeway. The Gulf Freeway and North Freeway both include reversible high-occupancy vehicle (HOV) lanes for busses and other high-occupancy vehicles to and from downtown Houston.

The freeway is the subject of ongoing controversy and federal investigation due to a proposed expansion project in Harris County, which would displace hundreds of people from their homes and worsen air quality. The local authorities have opposed the expansion project, while the Texas Department of Transportation (TxDOT) supports expansion, and negotiations are pending.

Route description
In addition to the official control cities of Galveston, Houston, and Dallas, I-45 serves a number of other communities, including La Marque, League City, Spring, The Woodlands, Conroe, Willis, Huntsville, Madisonville, Centerville, Buffalo, Fairfield, Corsicana, and Ennis.

US 287 signs are only posted (with I-45) from the northern end of Business Interstate 45-F (Bus. I-45-F) in Corsicana to the Ellis County line.

I-45 gained notoriety during Hurricane Rita in 2005. Thousands of Houston area evacuees jammed the roadway trying to leave. As a result, the freeway became a parking lot. Gas stations ran dry and hundreds of people's cars simply ran empty, their occupants having to spend the night along the shoulder. Four-hour drives suddenly became 24-hour drives. Even though TxDOT started contraflow lane reversal at Farm to Market Road 1488 (FM 1488), it did not alleviate the traffic jam deep into the city, as that starting point was even north of The Woodlands, which is close to Conroe, the northern terminus of the greater Houston area.

At just , I-45 is the shortest of the primary Interstates (ending in 0 or 5), and the only primary Interstate to be entirely inside of one state.

Gulf Freeway
The stretch of I-45 connecting Galveston with Houston is known as the Gulf Freeway. It was the first freeway built in Texas—opened in stages beginning on October 1, 1948, up to a full completion to Galveston in 1952, as part of US 75. At the north (Houston) end, it connects to the North Freeway via the short Pierce Elevated, completed in 1967. The section north of the curve near SH 3/Monroe Road in southeastern Houston was built on the right-of-way of the former Galveston–Houston Electric Railway, which entered downtown on Pierce Street.

After several interchanges, I-45 crosses the Galveston Causeway and passes Tiki Island. Old US 75 south of this junction was upgraded on the spot.

It includes interchanges with several other freeways: FM 1764 (Emmett F. Lowry Expressway), State Highway NASA Road 1 (NASA Road 1), and the Sam Houston Tollway, meeting the north end of SH 3 in southeastern Houston. (This part of SH 3—on Winkler Drive and Monroe Road—is not part of old US 75.) A center reversible HOV lane begins just south of the Sam Houston Tollway.

In Houston, I-45 meets I-610 and SH 35 at a complicated interchange. At the merge with Spur 5, a short freeway spur to the University of Houston, elevated collector–distributor roads (also part of Spur 5) begin. The collector–distributor roads and the HOV lane end at Emancipation Avenue, the original end of the Gulf Freeway. Just past Emancipation Avenue is an interchange with I-69/US 59 (Eastex Freeway and Southwest Freeway) and SH 288 (South Freeway), after which I-45 technically becomes the North Freeway as it runs along the northwest half of the block between Pierce Street and Gray Street as the Pierce Elevated.

The reversible HOV lane begins in downtown Houston at the intersection of St. Joseph Parkway and Emancipation Avenue, with easy access inbound to St. Joseph Parkway and outbound from Pierce Street. It runs down the median of the Gulf Freeway, mostly at the same level as the mainlanes. Ramps are provided for access to and from the following roads:
Eastwood Transit Center—full access
I-610 north frontage road—full access
Monroe Road and Monroe Park & Ride—full access
Fuqua Park & Ride and South Point Park & Ride—full access
Frontage roads north of Dixie Farm Road (FM 1959)—toward downtown, with a ramp stub for continuation

North Freeway

The I-45 North Freeway HOV begins in downtown Houston near the University of Houston–Downtown, with easy access inbound on Milam Street and outbound on Travis Street. Ramps and entrances are provided for access from the following roads. All are fully accessible.
I-10/US 90 westbound exit and entrance only
Quitman Street
Airline Drive (to Crosstimbers Road)
North Shepherd (to North Shepherd Park & Ride)
FM 525 (Aldine-Bender Road)
Kuykendahl Park & Ride
FM 1960 (to Spring Park & Ride) 
This provides constant HOV access with one lane on the northbound side and one lane on the southbound side with periodic dotted lines for access at major exits.

Julius Schepps Freeway
The stretch of I-45 along the Julius Schepps Freeway in Dallas, from the Trinity River to Downtown Dallas up to and including I-345, is elevated above the surrounding areas for most of its length. As such, when ice storms hit the Dallas area (usually on average one to two times per year), the freeway is shut down, and traffic is diverted to SH 310 and US 175, which parallel I-45.

History
In the initial assignment of state highways in 1917, Dallas–Fort Worth and Houston were connected by a branch of SH 2 (the Meridian Highway), which ran via Waco and Bryan and continued on to Galveston. The more direct route followed by I-45 was not initially part of the system between Richland and Huntsville; this cutoff was added by 1919 as SH 32, and US 75 was assigned to the alignment in 1926. Prior to the coming of the Interstate Highway System in the late 1950s, the only improvements to US 75 in Texas beyond building a two-lane paved roadway were in the Houston and Dallas areas. However, the highways in and near these cities included some of the first freeways in the state: the Gulf Freeway (Houston) and the Central Expressway (Dallas).

Gulf Freeway (Houston to Galveston)

The Galveston–Houston Electric Railway began operating an interurban between those cities on December 5, 1911, and last ran on October 31, 1936, though the Houston Electric Company, operator of Houston's city transit system, continued to run trains on the portion between downtown and Park Place. A proposal for a "superhighway" between the cities was first made in 1930, and Houston Mayor Oscar Holcombe began to work toward it later that decade. He announced an agreement with the Houston Electric Company on April 12, 1940, through which the company could convert its four remaining lines to busses in exchange for the right-of-way used by the Park Place line. This line was last used on June 9, 1940, the last day of streetcar service in Houston; the replacement is still operated by METRO as the 40 along Telephone Road.

Before the new highway was built, US 75 followed Galveston Road (now mostly SH 3), Broadway Street, and Harrisburg Boulevard into downtown Houston. SH 225 carried traffic from La Porte along La Porte Road to US 75 in Harrisburg, and SH 35 connected Alvin with downtown Houston along Telephone Road and Leeland Street. Plans made in October 1943, when the Texas Transportation Commission signed an agreement with Houston and Harris County, referred to the new bypass as a relocation of US 75. Drawings were released by the state on January 31, 1946, and included almost continuous frontage roads, broken only at railroad crossings. Initially, the two southwestern streets—Pierce Street and Calhoun Avenue (now St. Joseph Parkway)—carried traffic toward the freeway, and the other two—Jefferson and Pease Streets—carried exiting traffic; once the freeway was completed far enough to allow US 75 to be marked along it, Pease and Pierce streets carried that highway to Fannin Street.

The first freeway dedication in the state took place at 7:00 pm on September 30, 1948, at the overpass over Calhoun Road by the University of Houston. The roadway between downtown and Telephone Road was opened to traffic after speeches, but lacked an official name, being called the "Interurban Expressway", after the rail line that it replaced, by the press. Mayor Holcombe quickly started a contest to assign a name, and the city chose the winning entry on December 17, 1948. Sara Yancy of Houston Heights won $100 (equivalent to $ in ) for her submission of "Gulf Freeway", named for the Gulf of Mexico that the highway would reach when completed. The freeway was extended to Griggs Road in February 1951, Reveille Street (onto which SH 35 was realigned) in July 1951, and was completed to the Galveston Causeway on August 2, 1952, with a ceremony on the bridge over FM 517 near Dickinson. However, beyond Reveille Street, the road was not built to freeway standards, with 32 at-grade intersections, though no traffic signals. The highway curved away from the old interurban right-of-way near Monroe Road, about where the Park Place streetcar line had ended. In December 1952, a short spur, now part of I-610, was opened to connect with SH 225. A three-way split in the northwest part of Park Place, near where Gulfgate Shopping Center opened in 1956, carried nonstop traffic to and from SH 35 and SH 225. This split was also the location of a lane drop; the roadway carried six lanes (three in each direction) between Houston and the interchange, and four beyond to Galveston. After the new US 75 was completed, the old road between downtown and South Houston was dropped from the state highway system, while the remainder became SH 3, connecting to the Gulf Freeway via Winkler Drive, effective August 20, 1952.

The first major change was made in preparation for the North Freeway connection, when the directions of Calhoun Avenue and Jefferson Street were swapped so that they would alternate. A bridge, dated 1954, was built to carry traffic from Jefferson Street over traffic to Jefferson Street, and US 75 was moved to Calhoun Avenue northbound, soon crossing downtown on the oneway pair of Calhoun Avenue and Pierce Street to the new North Freeway. A median barrier was added in 1956 to prevent crossover accidents. Southeast of downtown Houston, the at-grade intersections proved dangerous, and only two had been replaced with interchanges by 1959, when the Texas Highway Department began a program to upgrade the road to full freeway standards. Frontage roads would be required along the entire highway, since the state had not purchased access rights, and so abutting property owners were able to build driveways to the road. To accomplish this, traffic was shifted to the newly built frontage roads so that the central main lanes could be reconstructed. This grade separation was completed from Houston to Almeda-Genoa Road (exit 34) in June 1959, FM 1959 (exit 30) in October 1964, FM 518 (exit 23) in December 1970, and FM 1764 (exit 15) in 1976. As the section beyond FM 1764 into Galveston had already been rebuilt, this marked the completion of the Gulf Freeway as an actual freeway.

As the first freeway in Texas, the standards of the Gulf Freeway soon became inadequate, with poor sight lines and little room to merge when entering. It also attracted development, such as Gulfgate Shopping City, the first mall in the Houston area, the Manned Spacecraft Center, and many residential developments. Heavy congestion began to affect the freeway by the early 1960s; two roughly parallel freeways—the Harrisburg Freeway and Alvin Freeway—were proposed at that time to relieve the traffic but were not built. A short project to widen the road to six lanes between I-610 and Sims Bayou was completed in 1960, and ramp meters were installed in 1966. The I-610 interchange was rebuilt with direct connections for most movements in 1975. Plans to reconstruct the freeway near downtown began in 1972, taking about 170 houses and 22 businesses from the southwest side for the room to expand the main lanes and add parallel lanes for the Alvin Freeway. Local opposition was unsuccessful at stopping the project, and construction on this segment, and others to the southeast, took place in the 1980s. The lanes were shifted outward to make room for the transitway, which opened to I-610 on May 16, 1988. These lanes were inspired by the similar ones on the Shirley Highway in the Washington Metropolitan Area. That year also marked the end of the reconstruction inside I-610, along with the elevated distribution lanes alongside the mainlanes near downtown; the first short piece of the Alvin Freeway was finally connected to these in 1999. This project gave I-45 its current configuration, mostly eight mainlanes wide, from Sims Bayou past I-610 to Griggs Road in 1981, to Telephone Road in 1982, to Lockwood Drive in 1985, and, finally, to downtown in 1988.

However, this was not the end of construction on the Gulf Freeway. The highway beyond I-610 to FM 1959, which had just been upgraded in the 1950s and 1960s, saw an extension of the transitway to a temporary end near FM 1959, widening to eight lanes, and a large stack interchange at the Sam Houston Tollway. This reconstruction was completed between Almeda-Genoa Road and College Avenue in 1991, between College Avenue and Sims Bayou in 1994, and, finally in 1997, there was no construction anywhere on the entire length of the freeway when the tollway interchange was opened, along with the widening between Almeda-Genoa Road and FM 1959. A 1999 study recommended widening the entire stretch from the Sam Houston Tollway to Galveston to at least eight lanes. Construction to replace the Galveston Causeway began in mid-2003, and work on a section through Webster, including a new interchange with NASA Road 1, began in mid-2007.

Widening of the freeway between Kurland Drive at Bay Area Boulevard began in July 2011. This construction will expand the number of freeway lanes from six to ten and increase the number of frontage lanes from four to six. The HOV lane will be extended to the southern end of the construction. It will also involve rebuilding the overpasses at Dixie Farm Road and Clear Lake City Boulevard.

The project has six phases. Phase one is the reconstruction of the mainlanes from the northern end of the project to just south of FM 1959. The end of this phase will include the demolition and reconstruction of the bridge at the FM 1959 intersection. Phase two, planned to begin in mid-2012, will be the reconstruction of the frontage roads from just south of FM 1959 to the southern end of the project. Phase three will be the reconstruction of the mainlanes on the southern half of the project and is planned to begin in mid-2013. Phase four, scheduled to start late 2014, will be the demolition and reconstruction of the overpass at Clear Lake City Boulevard. Phase five, (which was completed) was the demolition and reconstruction of El Dorado Boulevard and Bay Area Boulevard. The demolition and reconstruction was finished in 2016. As a result, the 1960s-era cloverleaf interchanges (with the exception of Fuqua Street and Scarsdale Boulevard) have been eliminated with overpasses. Phase six will be making the new lanes of the freeway. It will have five lanes each direction along with the new overpasses for those two underpasses. This will be completed 2017.

In 2015, reconstruction and widening of I-45 began in Downtown Houston due to heavy traffic. The southbound onramp from Allen Parkway will be moved to enter on the right side, and longrange plans call for the demolition of the outdated Pierce Elevated, with the reroute of I-45 being along I-69/US 59 and I-10/US 90 to the North Freeway; The parts of the Gulf Freeway at I-10 and I-45 will be known as the Downtown Connector. If I-45 was rerouted and the Pierce Elevated demolished (and/or redeveloped into the proposed Pierce SkyPark as part of additional greenspace), the connecting ramps south of Allen Parkway would become a second downtown spur, which will result in the demise of a full freeway loop around Downtown Houston. , there are no plans to place the Pierce Elevated in a tunnel similar to Spur 366 in Dallas since the Houston Metro area is prone to flooding, especially in the aftermath of Hurricane Harvey.

North Freeway (Houston to Conroe)

The last alignment of US 75 before the North Freeway was built left downtown Houston to the northwest on Main Street, turning north at Airline Drive, and then northwest along the present alignment of I-45, then known as Stuebner Airline Road, Shepherd Drive, and East Montgomery Road. The freeway replacement was authorized in stages between May 1945 and June 1952, when the Texas Transportation Commission adopted plans for a freeway all the way between Houston and Dallas. The North Freeway name was adopted in 1956; an unsuccessful proposal in 1965 would have renamed it the Dallas Freeway. The first short piece of the freeway to open crossed Buffalo Bayou, connecting the two oneway pairs from the north end of the Gulf Freeway with the south end of Houston Avenue. This was opened on December 12, 1955, and allowed US 75 to bypass its run on Main Street; it included interchanges with Allen Parkway and Memorial Drive. The next piece near downtown opened on July 24, 1962, leaving the 1955 freeway in the Allen Parkway interchange, passing east of Houston Avenue, and connected to an already-built portion at I-610. The six-lane Pierce Elevated, which occupies half a block on the southwest side of Pierce Street, required the acquisition of a number of commercial properties; the cost prevented the full block from being used. This portion opened on August 18, 1967, connecting the Gulf and North Freeways and bypassing the "four-street distribution system", which remains in its original form to this day.

The first piece of the North Freeway to be built outside I-610 was an upgrade of existing US 75 on Stuebner Airline Road, between Airline Drive and Shepherd Drive, opened in December 1959. In April 1961, this was completed to the interchange with I-610, and, on July 24, 1962, the downtown section was extended north to meet it. As each section opened, US 75 was moved to it, temporarily using I-610 to Airline Drive for about a year. At the other end, US 75 was upgraded from Spring Creek at the north edge of Spring north to the San Jacinto River south of Conroe in 1960. In between, the upgrade was completed from FM 525 to near Richey Road in December 1961, south to the 1959 segment in February 1963, and north to the 1960 segment in March 1963, completing the North Freeway except for the Pierce Elevated (1967). The freeway as initially built had eight lanes (four in each direction) between downtown and I-610, six to FM 1960, and four north of FM 1960.

Like the Gulf Freeway, the North Freeway soon became congested. The oil boom of the 1970s resulted in large-scale residential development along the highway, most notably The Woodlands. Since the corridor was strongly directional, with 65 percent of peak-hour traffic going in the peak direction, a  contraflow lane for busses and other high-occupancy vehicles was implemented later that decade, opening on August 28, 1979, between downtown and Shepherd Drive (exit 56B). The facility, operating during both rush hour periods, occupied the leftmost lane of the other direction and was separated from the other lanes with a movable pylon every . However, off-peak traffic was increasing, and construction began in 1983 on a more permanent reversible transitway in the median. Thus, the second transitway in Houston (a month after the one on the Katy Freeway), opened on November 23, 1984, replacing the contraflow lane.

Reconstruction of the mainlanes and frontage roads to handle increased traffic began in 1982 just north of downtown. No lanes were added south of I-610, but the eight-lane crosssection, with room for a transitway, was continued north as construction progressed. Work was completed south of Airline Drive (exit 53) in about 1985, to Shepherd Drive (exit 56B) in 1987, and to FM 525 (exit 60A) in 1990; this last opening allowed the transitway to extend to just south of FM 525. The Hardy Toll Road, completed on June 28, 1988, between I-610 and I-45 near The Woodlands, added capacity to that part of the corridor, and, in 1990, reconstruction was completed on a short piece of I-45 from the toll road into The Woodlands. Reconstruction continued from FM 525, reaching Airtex Boulevard (exit 63) in 1997, including part of the Sam Houston Tollway interchange (completed in 2003) and a transitway extension, Cypresswood Drive (exit 68) in 1998, extending the transit way to its present terminus, and the Hardy Toll Road (exit 72) in 2003. Work on the section through The Woodlands to Research Forest Drive (exit 77) was completed in 2001, including a direct connection to Woodlands Parkway, and, in 2003, work was completed to FM 1488 (exit 81). Construction is now complete between FM 1488 to the Walker County line near milepost 100 just south of the northbound truck weigh station and New Waverly, near SH 75 (exit 98).

, widening of the North Freeway from Downtown Houston to Sam Houston Tollway began; The plan for the project is to widen the freeway by adding managed lanes and adding the North Shepherd on- and offramps also known as Spur 261 (which was already completed) prior to the I-45 widening project. This project has generated major controversy, with proponents claiming it would "enhance safety and mobility", while opponents point out that it would worsen air quality and greenhouse gas emissions, displace hundreds of people, and fail to meaningfully address congestion. 

Authorities in Harris County, Texas, have sued TxDOT to stop the expansion, and the federal government has investigated the expansion project to determine whether it violates any civil rights or environmental laws. Among others, the expansion is opposed by US Representative Sheila Jackson Lee and Harris County Judge Lina Hidalgo. If completed, the highway's width will double to 480 feet, wider than a football field. The highway expansion would displace around a thousand residents, including 919 units in 16 apartment complexes, 160 single-family homes, five places of worship, and two schools. An apartment complex has been acquired and vacated by TxDOT, which plans to demolish it for the expansion. TxDOT was heavily criticized for this planned demolition, as the apartment complex slated for demolition has been described as an example of good urban planning. 

Parts of the freeway are paralleled by the METRORail Red Line.

Between Conroe and Richland
The first part of I-45 between Conroe and Richland was the bypass around Huntsville.

Richland to Dallas (Julius Schepps Freeway)
The Central Expressway was the first freeway in Dallas, built as a new alignment of US 75. It first opened between San Jacinto Street and Fitzhugh Avenue in 1949 and soon stretched south to Hutchins. However, the stretch through downtown ran along the surface, as did the part south of the bridge over the Trinity River, due to diversion of funds to the north portion. By the late 1950s, a bypass to the east of the downtown section was planned. By the time construction reached Hutchins, in about 1955, the state decided to build further segments to full freeway standards. By 1961, the freeway was complete between Hutchins and the SH 14 split at Richland, except for the bypass around Corsicana, which was built c. 1964. This freeway was mostly built along the existing US 75; one of the projects in Navarro County, near Corsicana, was the first Interstate project in Texas approved under the Federal Aid Highway Act of 1956.

It was not until 1964 that I-345, extending I-45 north along the proposed Central Expressway bypass, was added as a proposed state highway. I-45 and I-345 were built and opened in the 1970s, with the final section, between Lamar Street (exit 283A) and the Central Expressway (exit 283B), opening on February 25, 1976. At the north end, before it merged into the Central Expressway (which continued to carry US 75), I-345 straddled the bridges over Bryan Street and Ross Avenue, the latter the location of the opening ceremonies in 1949. Because of their location, these two bridges were not replaced in the 1990s reconstruction of the North Central Expressway and are the only surviving grade separations from the initial construction north from downtown.

At the time the interchange with I-20 was built, the freeway that crossed I-45 was then a part of I-635; it would not be until later when, initially, I-20 was added to I-635 as a multiplex, then later still, I-635 would be truncated away from the I-45 interchange (back around to just north of what is now I-20's interchange with US 175).

Reconstruction and widening to six lanes, from the Ellis–Navarro county line (between exits 243 and 244) north to SH 310 (exit 275), began in 1991. The last section, near the north end, was completed in 2002.

Exit list

Related routes

 Interstate 345
 Texas State Highway 3
 Texas State Highway 75
 Texas State Highway 310
 U.S. Route 75 in Texas
 U.S. Route 175

Notes

References

External links

 
Interstate Guide: I-45
I-45 info/history page—from dfwfreeways.info
METRO - Gulf Freeway HOV system & map

 
45
45
Transportation in Galveston County, Texas
Transportation in Harris County, Texas
Transportation in Montgomery County, Texas
Transportation in Walker County, Texas
Transportation in Madison County, Texas
Transportation in Leon County, Texas
Transportation in Freestone County, Texas
Transportation in Navarro County, Texas
Transportation in Ellis County, Texas
Transportation in Dallas County, Texas